The Bennett-Kelly Farm is an historic home and farm complex located at Sykesville, Carroll County, Maryland, United States. The complex consists of a stone and frame house, a stone mounting block, a stone smokehouse, a frame bank barn, a frame wagon shed, a frame chicken house, a concrete block dairy or tool shed, and a stone spring house. The original mid-19th century stone section of the house is three bays wide and two stories high. The house features a one-bay Greek Revival pedimented portico with Doric columns. It is an example of a type of family farmstead that characterized rural agricultural Carroll County from the mid 19th century through the early 20th century.

The Bennett-Kelly Farm was listed on the National Register of Historic Places in 2004.

References

External links
, including photo in 2003, at Maryland Historical Trust

Houses on the National Register of Historic Places in Maryland
Houses in Carroll County, Maryland
Houses completed in 1839
Greek Revival houses in Maryland
Sykesville, Maryland
National Register of Historic Places in Carroll County, Maryland